ISAS may refer to:

 International School for Advanced Studies, a post-graduate teaching and research institute in Trieste, Italy
 Institute of Space and Astronautical Science, a Japanese research institute currently part of the Japan Aerospace Exploration Agency
 Independent Schools Association of the Southwest, an association of 89 independent schools located in Arizona, Kansas, Louisiana, New Mexico, Oklahoma, and Texas.
 Ictal-Interictal SPECT Analysis by SPM, a method of localizing seizures